Stefanos Ioannidis (born 23 March 1933) is a Greek wrestler. He competed at the 1960, 1964, 1968 and the 1972 Summer Olympics.

References

External links
 

1933 births
Living people
Greek male sport wrestlers
Olympic wrestlers of Greece
Wrestlers at the 1960 Summer Olympics
Wrestlers at the 1964 Summer Olympics
Wrestlers at the 1968 Summer Olympics
Wrestlers at the 1972 Summer Olympics
Sportspeople from Kilkis
20th-century Greek people